The 2019 Great Yarmouth Borough Council election took place on 2 May 2019 to elect members of Great Yarmouth Borough Council in England. This was on the same day as other local elections in England.

Summary

Election result

|-

Ward results

Bradwell North

Bradwell South and Hopton

Caister North

Caister South

Central and Northgate

Claydon

East Flegg

Fleggburgh

Gorleston

Lothingland

Magdalen

Nelson

Ormesby

Southtown and Cobholm

St Andrews

West Flegg

Yarmouth North

References 

2019 English local elections
2019
2010s in Norfolk
May 2019 events in the United Kingdom